Masparro River is a river of Venezuela. It is part of the Orinoco River basin.

See also
List of rivers of Venezuela

References
Rand McNally, The New International Atlas, 1993.

Rivers of Venezuela